Trine Krogh (18 January 1955 – 3 May 2014) was a Norwegian freestyle, butterfly and medley swimmer. She was born in Oslo, and represented the club Oslo IL. She competed at the 1972 Summer Olympics in Munich, in 200 m medley and 400 m medley.

References

External links
Trine Krogh's obituary 

1955 births
2014 deaths
Sportspeople from Oslo
Norwegian female butterfly swimmers
Olympic swimmers of Norway
Swimmers at the 1972 Summer Olympics
Norwegian female medley swimmers